Good Christian Fun is a podcast about Christian pop culture hosted by Kevin T. Porter and Caroline Ely.

Background 
The show is hosted by Kevin T. Porter and Caroline Ely. The show debuted in 2017 and was Porter's follow up podcast to Gilmore Guys. The podcast is focused on Christian pop culture. Episode three is focused on DC Talk. Amy Grant has been interviewed on the show.

References

External links 

Audio podcasts
2017 podcast debuts
Christian podcasts
Interview podcasts
American podcasts